"Tantur" (from Arabic: الطنطورة, al-Tantura, lit. The Peak/Hill) may refer to:
 Tantur Ecumenical Institute: An institute of advanced theological research in ecumenism located on Tantur hill in Jerusalem, near Bethlehem.
 Tantour: a conical headdress in traditional Lebanese culture
 Tantura: a fishing village on the Israeli coast, build upon the Phoenician city of Dor.